Wellington Cirino Priori (born 21 February 1990) is a Brazilian professional footballer who plays as a midfielder.

Career

Early career
Born in São Paulo, Wellington started his career with Brasil de Farroupilha where he played for three years before moving to São José. In 2013, Wellington had a training stint with Dutch Eredivisie side, FC Twente. The club was interested in signing him but due to passport complications, the move to the Netherlands did not materialize. After his training stint with Twente, Wellington signed for Thai League T1 side Army United. A season later, Wellington signed with Thai Division 1 League side Pattaya United. After another season, Wellington moved to South Korea to K League Classic side Gwangju.

NorthEast United
On 3 August 2016, Priori moved to India and signed with NorthEast United of the Indian Super League.

Jamshedpur
On 9 January 2018, Priori signed with Jamshedpur of the Indian Super League.

On 29 March 2019, Priori joined Bangladesh Premier League club Dhaka Abahani.

Jamshedpur 
In August 2022, Priori returned to defending Indian Super League premiers Jamshedpur. On 6 December, Priori's contract was terminated by mutual agreement with immediate effect.

Career statistics

References

External links 
 Wellington Priori at playmakerstats.com (English version of ceroacero.es)
Thaileague Official Website: Chainat Hornbill F.C. Players

1990 births
Living people
Footballers from São Paulo
Brazilian footballers
Wellington Priori
Gwangju FC players
NorthEast United FC players
Jamshedpur FC players
Association football defenders
Association football midfielders
Wellington Priori
K League 1 players
Expatriate footballers in Thailand
Expatriate footballers in South Korea
Expatriate footballers in India